Kimiko Date-Krumm was the defending champion, but chose to not compete this year.  Misaki Doi defeated Junri Namigata in the final 7–5, 6–2.

Seeds

Draw

Finals

Top half

Bottom half

References
 Main Draw
 Qualifying Draw

Dunlop World Challenge - Women's Singles
Dunlop World Challenge
2010 Dunlop World Challenge